Ruth Hartman Frankel,  (c. 1903 – 3 November 1989) was honoured as a Companion of the Order of Canada in 1969 due to her work for the Canadian Cancer Society.

The Chicago-born Ruth Hartman emigrated to Canada in 1925 when she married Egmont Leo Frankel (d. 1964). She died in Toronto, predeceased by one of her three children.

Frankel was active with the Canadian Cancer Society in the late 1940s. In 1950, she founded the Toronto chapter of the Canadian Cancer Society. Subsequently, she worked towards the creation of a lodge at the Princess Margaret Hospital, a facility specialising in cancer treatment. She is also the author of the book Three Cheers for Volunteers (1965, Clarke Irwin).

In early 1954, Ontario provincial law was changed to permit Frankel to become the first woman to join the Board of Governors for the Ontario Cancer Treatment and Research Foundation.

The Ruth Hartman Frankel Humanitarian Award was established by the society to honour those who have supported research into cancer. Isadore Sharp was the first recipient on 25 September 1983 for his support for Terry Fox and subsequent Terry Fox Run campaigns. However, as of May 2006, Internet searches that included the Canadian Cancer Society website have not yet found any cases where this award was presented after 1983.

In 1985, Frankel was given an honorary fellowship by Ryerson Polytechnical Institute (now Toronto Metropolitan University).

References

External links
 Harry Palmer Gallery: Ruth Frankel portrait, 1984

1900s births
1989 deaths
Year of birth uncertain
Companions of the Order of Canada